Organogallium chemistry is the chemistry of organometallic compounds containing a carbon to gallium (Ga) chemical bond. Despite their high toxicity , organogallium compounds have some use in organic synthesis. The compound trimethylgallium is of some relevance to MOCVD as a precursor to gallium arsenide via its reaction with arsine at 700 °C: 
Ga(CH3)3 + AsH3 → GaAs + 3CH4
Gallium trichloride is an important reagent for the introduction of gallium into organic compounds.

The main gallium oxidation state is Ga(III), as in all lower group 13 elements (such as aluminium).

Organogallium(III) chemistry
Compounds of the type R3Ga are monomeric. Lewis acidity decreases in the order Al > Ga > In and as a result organogallium compounds do not form bridged dimers as organoaluminum compounds do. Organogallium compounds are also less reactive than organoaluminum compounds. They do form stable peroxides.

Organogallium compounds can be synthesized by transmetallation, for example the reaction of gallium metal with dimethylmercury:
2Ga + 3Me2Hg → 2Me3Ga + 3 Hg
or via organolithium compounds or Grignards:
GaCl3 + 3MeMgBr → Me3Ga +  3MgBrCl

The electron-deficient nature of gallium can be removed by complex formation, for example
Me2GaCl + NH3 → [Me2Ga(NH3)Cl]+Cl−
 
Pi complex formation with alkynes is also known.
 
Organogallium compounds are reagents or intermediates in several classes of organic reactions:
 Barbier-type reactions with elemental gallium, allylic substrates and carbonyl compounds
 Carbometallation (carbogallation) reactions

Higher group 13 organometallic chemistry
Organoindium chemistry  and organothallium chemistry parallel that of organogallium in many regards. Indium and thallium in oxidation state +1 are more common, for example the metallocenes cyclopentadienylindium(I) and cyclopentadienylthallium. Trimethylindium is important in the semiconductor industry. A special thallium feature is electrophilic thallation of arene compounds, reminiscent of mercuration (the group 12 neighbor). A common reagent for this purpose is thallium(III) trifluoroacetate. The intermediate arylthallium bisfluoroacetate can be isolated and converted to an aryl halide, aryl cyanide, aryl thiol or nitroarene. An example is the iodination of para-xylene.
:
A specific niche indium research topic is indium mediated allylation.

References

Gallium compounds
Organometallic compounds